Alan, Allan or Allen Kaufman may refer to:

Writers
Allan Kaufman, scenarist for the 1957 film Hell Canyon Outlaws
Alan S. Kaufman (born 1944), psychologist and educator
Alan Kaufman (writer), novelist and poet active since 1980s

Others 
Allen Kaufman (born 1933), chess master
Allan Kaufman, political figure who lost to Dorothy Dobbie in 1988

See also
Kaufman (surname)